Týnec may refer to places in the Czech Republic:

Týnec (Břeclav District), a municipality and village in the South Moravian Region
Týnec (Klatovy District), a municipality and village in the Plzeň Region
Týnec nad Labem, a town in the Central Bohemian Region
Týnec nad Sázavou, a town in the Central Bohemian Region
Hrochův Týnec, a town in the Pardubice Region
Panenský Týnec, a market town in the Ústí nad Labem Region
Velký Týnec, a municipality and village in the Olomouc Region